The 10"/31 caliber gun Mark 1 Mod 1 (spoken "ten-inch-thirty-one--caliber") and the 10"/35 caliber gun Mark 1 Mod 2 were both used for the primary batteries of the United States Navy's   monitor . The 10"/30 caliber gun Mark 2 was used as main armament on the remaining Amphitrite-class monitors, the monitor , and the armored cruiser .

This  gun had been in development since 1885. The Navy desired a light weight heavy weapon with a 10-inch bore to arm their coastal monitors and the armored cruiser Maine, which would later be classified a "Second Class Battleship." The 10-inch/31 caliber gun would be the first heavy breech loader (BL) gun in the "New Navy" and be the ancestor to all large caliber BL guns built in the United States.

Mark 1
The 10-inch Mark 1 was a built-up gun constructed in a length of 31 caliber, Mod 0 and Mod 1, and also 35 caliber, Mod 2. These were both mounted in pairs on Mianonomoh and numbered 1–4 by the Navy. Both of the Mod 0 and Mod 1 guns had a tube, jacket, with the Mod 1 having a thicker jacket, and 15 hoops with a locking ring. The hoops started  from the breech and extended to the muzzle. The Mod 2, was a 35 caliber gun of similar constructions but had only 14 hoops with a locking ring. These were all constructed of gun steel.

Mark 2
The Mark 2 was an even simpler construction with only 11 hoops, a different breech mechanism and reverting to a shorter, 30 caliber length, barrel. Eighteen were built, Nos. 5–26. These would be the guns used on the remaining Amphitrite-class monitors, Monterey, and Maine.

Naval service

Surviving Guns
Two Mark 2 guns from USS Maine exist in Havana, Cuba, where they were incorporated into a memorial dedicated to victims of the ship's destruction.

Notes

References

Books
 
 
Online sources

External links

 Bluejackets Manual, 1917, 4th revision: US Navy 14-inch Mark 1 gun

Naval guns of the United States
254 mm artillery